Below are the squads for the Football at the 2003 All-Africa Games, hosted by Abuja, Nigeria, and which took place between 4 and 16 October 2003.

Group A

Nigeria

Senegal

South Africa

Zambia

Group B

Algeria
Head coach: Rachid Aït Mohamed and Abderrahmane Mehdaoui

Cameroon

Egypt

Ghana

External links
Football VIII All Africa Games - Abuja 2003 - todor66.com

Squads
2003